The 2022 European Karate Championships was the 57th edition of the European Karate Championships and 4th European Para Karate Championships, held in Gaziantep, Turkey from 25 to 29 May 2022.

Medal table

Medalists

Men

Women

Participating nations 
505 athletes from 44 countries participated:

  (4)
  (6)
  (12)
  (17)
  (10)
  (26)
  (9)
  (24)
  (9)
  (5)
  (6)
  (3)
  (20)
  (3)
  (8)
  (22)
  (9)
  (14)
  (14)
  (16)
  (3)
  (6)
  (10)
  (20)
  (15)
  (7)
  (3)
  (7)
  (17)
  (19)
  (7)
  (2)
  (12)
  (15)
  (17)
  (6)
  (17)
  (14)
  (8)
  (9)
  (11)
  (21)
  (18)
  (3)
 Refugee Karate Team (1)

Para-Karate

Medal table

Participating nations 
50 athletes from 16 countries participated:

  (5)
  (3)
  (1)
  (2)
  (4)
  (1)
  (4)
  (6)
  (5)
  (1)
  (2)
  (1)
  (1)
  (8)
  (5)
  (1)

References

External links
 World Karate Federation
 Results book
 Results book – Para-Karate

European Championships, 2022
2022 in Turkish sport
2022
2022
Karate competitions in Turkey
European Karate Championships
Sport in Gaziantep
Karate